The London Assembly election of 2012 was an election of members to the London Assembly which took place on Thursday, 3 May 2012, the same day as the 2012 London mayoral election, and the 2012 United Kingdom local elections. Although Conservative candidate Boris Johnson won the Mayoral election, the Assembly election produced the Labour Party's best result since the inception of the London Assembly; this was subsequently surpassed by the party's performance in the 2016 election.

Overview
The Assembly is elected by the Additional Member System. There are fourteen directly elected constituencies, all of which have, to date, only ever been won by the Conservative Party or the Labour Party. An additional eleven members are allocated by a London wide top-up vote with the proviso that parties must win at least five percent of the vote to qualify for the list seats.

All registered electors (British, Irish, Commonwealth and European Union citizens) living in London who were aged 18 or over on Thursday 3 May 2012 were entitled to vote in the Assembly election. Those who were temporarily away from London (for example, away working, on holiday, in student accommodation or in hospital) were also entitled to vote in the Assembly election. The deadline to register to vote in the election was midnight on Wednesday 18 April 2012, though anyone who qualified as an anonymous elector had until midnight on Thursday 26 April 2012 to register.

Candidates

Constituency candidates

London-wide List Candidates

Opinion Polls

Constituency

Regional

Results

|-
!rowspan=3 colspan=2 | Parties
!colspan=10 | Additional member system
!rowspan=2 colspan=5 | Total seats
|-
!colspan=5 |Constituency
!colspan=5 |Region
|-
! Votes !! % !! +/− !! Seats !! +/− 
! Votes !! % !! +/− !! Seats !! +/−
! Total !! +/− !! %
|-

|-
! style="background-color: #70147A |
| style="text-align:left;" |Fresh Choice for London†
| style="text-align:right;" | 95,849
| style="text-align:right;" | 4.3
| style="text-align:right;" | 1.4
| style="text-align:right;" | 0
| style="text-align:right;" | 
| style="text-align:right;" | 100,040
| style="text-align:right;" | 4.5
| style="text-align:right;" | 2.6
| style="text-align:right;" | 0
| style="text-align:right;" | 
| style="text-align:right;" | 0
| style="text-align:right;" | 
| style="text-align:right;" | -
|-

|-
|   || Total || 2,207,677 ||  ||  || 14 ||   || 2,215,008 ||  ||  || 11 ||  || 25 ||   ||
|}

†Note: UKIP were listed on the ballot paper as 'Fresh Choice for London'.

See also
Greater London Authority
Mayor of London

Notes

References

External links
 London Elects homepage

2012 elections in the United Kingdom
Assembly election
2012
May 2012 events in the United Kingdom